Simon is a 1980 American comedy film written and directed by Marshall Brickman and starring Alan Arkin.

Plot summary 
The Institute for Advanced Concepts, a group of scientists with an unlimited budget and a propensity for elaborate pranks, brainwash a psychology professor named Simon Mendelssohn who was abandoned at birth and manage to convince him, and the rest of the world, that he is of extraterrestrial origin. Simon escapes and attempts to reform American culture by overriding TV signals with a high-powered TV transmitter, becoming a national celebrity in the process.

Cast 

In addition, Fred Gwynne plays Korey, while David Susskind and Dick Cavett both appear in cameos as themselves.

Reception
Simon received mixed reviews from critics. On Rotten Tomatoes, the film holds a rating of 60% from 20 reviews.

Gene Siskel of the Chicago Tribune gave the film 2 out of 4 stars, saying that the film is "neither a funny nor insightful film. In fact, "Simon" is a scattershot mess." Both he and Roger Ebert of the Chicago Sun-Times gave the film two "no" votes on their show Sneak Previews. Nathan Rabin, in a 2012 review for The A.V. Club, rated Simon a B-, stating that the film "is riddled with moments of genius, yet shows only an intermittent interest in harnessing all that brainy inspiration into a satisfying narrative... [i]ts too scattered".

Awards
At the 8th Saturn Awards, Alan Arkin was nominated for the Saturn Award for Best Actor.

Home video availability
In 1981 and 1990, the film was released on VHS format by Warner Home Video and is now out of print. A remastered copy of the film was released via Warner Archives' Made To Order DVD-R service in 2011 in its original full-frame 16x9 (1.85:1) format.

Notes

External links 
 
 
 
 

1980 films
1980 comedy films
1980 science fiction films
1980s English-language films
1980s satirical films
1980s science fiction comedy films
Films set in Columbia University
American political satire films
American science fiction comedy films
Films directed by Marshall Brickman
Films produced by Martin Bregman
Films with screenplays by Marshall Brickman
Orion Pictures films
Warner Bros. films
1980s American films